Charleston station may refer to:

Transportation 
 Charleston railway station, a closed station in Charleston, South Australia, Australia
 Charleston station (Utah), a Heber Valley Railroad station in Deer Creek State Park north of Charleston, Utah, United States
 Charleston station (West Virginia), an Amtrak train station in Charleston, West Virginia, United States
 North Charleston station, an intermodal transportation center in North Charleston, South Carolina, United States
 Charleston Union Station Company, a former railroad company based in Charleston, South Carolina, United States

Military 
 Charleston Air Force Station, a former United States Air Force Station in Charleston, Maine, United States
 Naval Weapons Station Charleston, a United States Navy base located on the west bank of the Cooper River, in South Carolina, United States, now named Naval Support Activity Charleston
 North Charleston Air Force Station, a closed United States Air Force General Surveillance Radar station in North Charleston, South Carolina, United States

See also 
 Charleston (disambiguation)
 Charlestown station (disambiguation)